Meri Ujala is a short story written by Haseeb Ashraf. It was published in May 2016 in Sialkot on a small level and got huge success. It was also published online by Sohni Digest in November.

Plot summary 
Meri Ujala starts with Fahad and Maham, a couple who live in the United Kingdom. They celebrate the birthday of Fahad's sister Ujala, who lives in Pakistan with her parents. Fahad tells her that she was only ten year old when Fahad left Pakistan due to his cousin named Saira. Maham forced him to go back to Pakistan and lived with family whom he missed very much. When they came back to Pakistan they know that Ujala is no more......

Characters 
Fahad   - Male lead who leaves Pakistan and lived in UK.

Maham   - Wife of Fahad who also live in UK.

Ujala   - Fahad younger sister who died due to black magic.

Sahir   - Brother of Fahad

Mehmood - Father of Fahad, Sahir and Ujala

Fazila  - Sister of Mehmood

Saira   - Fahad's cousin Fazeela's daughter

Maira   - Saira's sister and Sahir's wife

Publication 
Meri Ujala was published in Sialkot on small level by Idrak printers Sialkot and distributed by Haseeb Ashraf Friends Muaaz and Shakeel. According to Our information only 300 copies were printed.

Response 
Meri Ujala gets huge response and great praise from its readers. All 300 copies were sold instantly and after that Meri Ujala also published by Sohni digest online.
Meri Ujala also got published in Sarguzasht digest in February 2017.

Novelettes
Pakistani short stories
Urdu-language literature